Clarence Edwards may refer to:

 Clarence Ransom Edwards (1859–1931), American general
 Clarence Edwards (blues musician) (1933–1993), American blues musician